Big Lost Lake is an alpine lake in Blaine County, Idaho, United States, located in the Smoky Mountains in Sawtooth National Forest. The lake is most easily accessed via trail 135 from the end of forest road 170. The lake is located just east of Prairie Creek Peak. It is also near Smoky Lake, Little Lost Lake, and Upper and Lower Norton lakes.

References

Lakes of Idaho
Lakes of Blaine County, Idaho
Glacial lakes of the United States
Glacial lakes of the Sawtooth National Forest